In enzymology, a guanidinopropionase is an enzyme that catalyzes the chemical reaction

3-guanidinopropanoate + H2O  beta-alanine + urea

Thus, the two substrates of this enzyme are 3-guanidinopropanoate and H2O, whereas its two products are beta-alanine and urea.

This enzyme belongs to the family of hydrolases, those acting on carbon-nitrogen bonds other than peptide bonds, specifically in linear amidines.  The systematic name of this enzyme class is 3-guanidinopropanoate amidinopropionase. Other names in common use include GPase, and GPH.  It employs one cofactor, manganese.

References

 

EC 3.5.3
Manganese enzymes
Enzymes of unknown structure